Titina is a feminine given name. Notable people with the name include:

 Titina De Filippo (1898–1963), Italian actress and playwright
 Titina Loizidou, party in a landmark European legal case
 Titina Mocoroa (d. 2001), Argentine physicist
 Titina Silla (1943–1973), Bissau-Guinean soldier